The Samuel Crowthers Mitton House is a historic house in Wellsville, Utah. It was built in 1865, before Utah became a state, by Samuel Crowthers Mitton, a convert to the Church of Jesus Christ of Latter-day Saints who immigrated to the United States with his parents from Halifax, West Yorkshire, England. His family first settled in Illinois, and Mitton later lived in Farmington, Utah before moving to Wellsville, where he worked as a carpenter and cabinetmaker. The house has been listed on the National Register of Historic Places since November 19, 1982.

References

		
National Register of Historic Places in Cache County, Utah
Houses completed in 1865
1865 establishments in Utah Territory